Botataung Township (also Botahtaung Township) is an area of Yangon, Myanmar. Named after the Botahtaung Pagoda, the township consists of ten wards, and shares borders with Pazundaung Township is in the north and the east, Seikkan Township and Yangon River in the south, Kyauktada Township in the west and Mingala Taungnyunt township in the north.

The township has five primary schools, two middle schools, six high schools and a university. The township is home to three public and three private hospitals, including East Yangon General Hospital, also called Gandhi Hospital, one of the major hospitals in Yangon. One of the country's two Burmese language dailies Kyemon, is based out of here. (The township used to boast four national dailies--Kyemon, and the now defunct newspapers, The Botathaung and Loketha Pyithu Neizin, the Burmese-language version of the Working People's Daily.)

In October 2012, Pearl Land Company won a rental bid from the Myanma Port Authority to redevelop the Botahtaung jetty into a recreation area with hotels.

Population 
As of March 2018, population in Botataung Township is reported to be around 40,000 with a majority of females being over 21,000 and males  being over 18,000.

Landmarks
As Botahtaung township was part of the original city plan implemented by the British, it still has many colonial era buildings. Some of the buildings and structures of "architectural significance" are now designated landmarks by the Yangon City Development Committee.

See also
National Management Degree College (NMDC)

References

Townships of Yangon